Alsat-2A is an Algerian satellite operated by the Algerian Space Agency for cartography, management of agriculture, forestry, water, mineral and oil resources.
The satellite weighs  and carries an earth optical payload.

The satellite was launched on 12 July 2010 by ISRO using the PSLV-C15 rocket.

Structure
Alsat-2A is the successor of Alsat-1, which was launched on 28 November 2002. The satellite is intended to aid in cartography; gain information for agriculture, forestry and water management; facilitate the search for mineral resources; the planning of land use; and help in disaster response. The telescope can hold up to 35° outside the orbital plane images. Data transmission occurs in the X- and S-band. The power supply accepts a solar cell of two elements, which provides a maximum of 175 watts of electrical power for the operation of satellite systems and by lithium ion batteries with a total capacity of 15 ampere-hours is supported. The projected lifetime of the satellite is five years. For trajectory correction maneuvers, the satellite uses its hydrazine thrusters, of which it has  propellant for its lifetime. The stabilization is achieved by using star and sun sensors, reaction wheels, gyroscopes and GPS.

Start
The launch took place on 12 July 2010 at 05:52 CEST with four other satellites in the PSLV rocket C15 from the rocket launch site Satish Dhawan Space Centre. Then Alsat-2A was deployed, followed by the three nano or pico Studsat from India, Aïssat-1 from Norway and TIsat-1 from Switzerland.

See also

 Algeria national space programs

References

External links
 Astrium, ASAL: ALSAT-2 Programme (PDF; 3,9 MB)
 ASAL: Homepage (French)

Spacecraft launched in 2010
Earth imaging satellites
Satellites of Algeria